111th Street (Pullman) is a commuter rail station on Metra Electric's main branch in the Pullman neighborhood on the far south side of Chicago, Illinois.

The station is little more than a platform between the tracks over a bridge with street-level connections. No parking is available at the station, however there is a connection to two of the Chicago Transit Authority's bus routes.

The station was reconstructed with a waiting shelter, custom signage, and a total makeover to attract more passengers to the nearby Pullman National Monument.

Bus connections
CTA

  4 Cottage Grove 
 115 Pullman/115th

References

External links

Metra stations in Chicago
Former Illinois Central Railroad stations
Railway stations in the United States opened in 1916